Brighton is a town in eastern Salt Lake County, Utah, United States. It is part of the Salt Lake City, Utah Metropolitan Statistical Area.

Description
While the exact number of residents is unknown, as of 2018, the population was estimated to be between 180 and 260.

Both the Brighton Ski Resort and the Solitude Mountain Resort are located in Brighton.

History
The area was first settled in 1871 but remained unincorporated. On November 6, 2018, residents of the area voted for incorporation, which took effect January 1, 2020.

The community had post offices from 1889 to 1905 and from 1946 to 1953.

Climate
Brighton has a high-altitude cold continental climate (Köppen Dsb/Dsc), with dry summers and very snowy winters.

See also

 List of cities and towns in Utah

References

External links

Unincorporated communities in Salt Lake County, Utah
Salt Lake City metropolitan area
Mining communities in Utah
Populated places established in 1871
1871 establishments in Utah Territory